Lady Margaret Professor may refer to one of two theology professorships:

Lady Margaret Professor (Oxford)
Lady Margaret's Professor of Divinity at Cambridge